Lewiston may refer to:

Places

United States
Lewiston, Alabama
Lewiston, California
Lewiston, Georgia
Lewiston, Idaho
Lewiston, Idaho metropolitan area
Lewiston, Indiana
Lewiston, Maine
Lewiston, Maine metropolitan area
Lewiston, Michigan
Lewiston, Minnesota
Lewiston, Dakota County, Minnesota, an extinct town
Lewiston, Nebraska
Lewiston (town), New York
Lewiston (village), New York, a village within the town
Lewiston, North Carolina
Lewiston, Utah
Lewiston, Vermont
Lewiston, Virginia
Lewiston, Wisconsin, a town
Lewiston (community), Wisconsin, an unincorporated community

Elsewhere
Lewiston, Highland, Scotland
Lewiston, South Australia

Surname
David Lewiston (1929–2017), British collector of traditional music
Dennis Lewiston (1934–2014), American cinematographer
Harry Lewiston (1900–1965), American showman

See also
Lewistown (disambiguation)
Leweston (disambiguation)